The Wanderland Tour is a 2018 North American concert tour by violinist Lindsey Stirling. This was he sixth tour, and third Christmas tour, celebrating her album Warmer In The Winter.

Background
In 2017, Stirling released the Christmas album Warmer In The Winter and toured that December. Following the popularity of the seasonal tour, Stirling returned with a similar Christmas theme tour across 24 dates in North America.  It began in Reno, Nevada, on 23 November and concluded on December 22 in North Charleston, South Carolina.

Set list
The following set list is representative of the show in Philadelphia, Pennsylvania, on December 18, 2018. It is not representative of all concerts for the duration of the tour.

 "All I Want for Christmas Is You"
 "Christmas C'Mon"
 "Let It Snow! Let It Snow! Let It Snow!"
 "Warmer In The Winter"
 "Waiting for the Man With the Bag / Jingle Bell Rock"
 "I Saw Three Ships (Come Sailing In)"
 "Feeling Good"
 "Jingle Bells / Deck the Halls / It's Beginning to Look Like Christmas / Feliz Navidad / Hedwig's Theme / Grandma Got Ran Over by a Reindeer / O Holy Night"
 "Hallelujah"
 "Angels We Have Heard on High"
 "What Child Is This?"
 "Crystallize"
 "Dance of the Sugar Plum Fairy"
 "Santa Baby"
 "Run Rudolph Run"
 "We Three Gentlemen"
 "Carol of the Bells"
 "You're a Mean One, Mr. Grinch"

 Encore
 "I Wonder as I Wander"

Reception
Reception to the tour was very positive. Writing about the show at The Beacon Theatre, New York for Shutter16 David Zeck wrote "This show is literally the full package, it’s everything a performance should be, besides Stirling flawlessly performing Christmas classics on violin the show also features a heavy influence on many dance styles ranging from contemporary to ballot, ballroom and of course pop dance styles.". 

Meanwhile, Music Connection described the show as a "very special evening".

Tour dates

Personnel
Band
 Lindsey Stirling – violin
 Drew Steen – drums

References

External links
Official website

2018 concert tours
Lindsey Stirling concert tours